Irvington Township is a township located in Kossuth County, Iowa, United States.

History
Irvington Township was organized in 1857.

References

Townships in Kossuth County, Iowa
Townships in Iowa
1857 establishments in Iowa
Populated places established in 1857